Brad Balsley (born May 26, 1988) is an American sports shooter who specialized in the 25 meter rapid fire pistol and 25 meter center-fire pistol events. He won gold medals at the 2015 Pan American Games and 2010 and 2014 American championships.

Balsley took up shooting in 1994 and started competing in 2007. In 2008 he placed second at the 2008 IPSC Handgun World Shoot as a junior and eighth as a senior.

References

1988 births
Living people
American male sport shooters
ISSF pistol shooters
Shooters at the 2015 Pan American Games
Pan American Games medalists in shooting
Pan American Games gold medalists for the United States
Medalists at the 2015 Pan American Games
People from Uniontown, Pennsylvania
20th-century American people
21st-century American people